This article provides information on candidates who stood for the 1990 Australian federal election. The election was held on 24 March 1990.

Redistributions and seat changes
A redistribution occurred in Victoria and Western Australia.
In Victoria, the Labor-held seats of Henty and Streeton were abolished. The notionally Labor seat of Corinella was created. The Liberal-held seat of Deakin became notionally Labor, and the Labor-held seat of Isaacs became notionally Liberal.
The member for Bruce, Ken Aldred (Liberal), contested Deakin.
The member for Deakin, Julian Beale (Liberal), contested Bruce.
The member for Hotham, Lewis Kent (Labor), contested Corinella.
The member for Streeton, Tony Lamb (Labor), contested Deakin.
In Western Australia, the notionally Liberal seat of Pearce was created. The Labor-held seat of Moore became notionally Liberal.
Western Australian Senator Fred Chaney (Liberal) contested Pearce.
Queensland Senator John Stone (National) contested Fairfax.
South Australian Senator Janine Haines (Democrats) contested Kingston.
Tasmanian Senator Norm Sanders (Democrats) resigned from his Tasmanian seat to contest a Senate seat in the Australian Capital Territory.

Retiring Members and Senators

Labor
 Lionel Bowen MP (Kingsford-Smith, NSW)
 John Brown MP (Parramatta, NSW)
 David Charles MP (Isaacs, Vic)
 Joan Child MP (Henty, Vic)
 Barry Cohen MP (Robertson, NSW)
 Manfred Cross MP (Brisbane, Qld)
 Dick Klugman MP (Prospect, NSW)
 John Mountford MP (Banks, NSW)
 Tom Uren MP (Reid, NSW)
Senator Ray Devlin (Tas)
Senator John Morris (NSW)

Liberal
 Ian Macphee MP (Goldstein, Vic)
 James Porter MP (Barker, SA)
 Roger Shipton MP (Higgins, Vic)
 Peter White MP (McPherson, Qld)
Senator David Hamer (Vic)

National
 Evan Adermann MP (Fairfax, Qld)
 Ian Cameron MP (Maranoa, Qld)
 Bob Katter MP (Kennedy, Qld)
 Clarrie Millar MP (Wide Bay, Qld)

Democrats
Senator Michael Macklin (Qld)

House of Representatives
Sitting members at the time of the election are shown in bold text. Successful candidates are highlighted in the relevant colour. Where there is possible confusion, an asterisk (*) is also used.

Australian Capital Territory

New South Wales

Northern Territory

Queensland

South Australia

Tasmania

Victoria

Western Australia

Senate
Sitting Senators are shown in bold text. Tickets that elected at least one Senator are highlighted in the relevant colour. Successful candidates are identified by an asterisk (*).

Australian Capital Territory
Two seats were up for election. The Labor Party was defending one seat. The Liberal Party was defending one seat.

New South Wales
Six seats were up for election. The Labor Party was defending two seats. The Liberal-National Coalition was defending three seats. The Nuclear Disarmament Party was defending one seat (although Senator Irina Dunn contested the election as an independent). Senators Michael Baume (Liberal), Peter Baume (Liberal), John Faulkner (Labor), Paul McLean (Democrats), Graham Richardson (Labor) and Kerry Sibraa (Labor) were not up for re-election.

Northern Territory
Two seats were up for election. The Labor Party was defending one seat. The Country Liberal Party was defending one seat.

Queensland
Six seats were up for election. The Labor Party was defending three seats. The National Party was defending two seats. The Australian Democrats were defending one seat. Senators Florence Bjelke-Petersen (National), Mal Colston (Labor), David MacGibbon (Liberal), Warwick Parer (Liberal) and Margaret Reynolds (Labor) were not up for re-election. The seat held by Senator John Stone (National) was also not up for re-election but was vacant due to his resignation to contest the House of Representatives; this seat would be filled in May by Bill O'Chee.

South Australia
Six seats were up for election. The Labor Party was defending two seats. The Liberal Party was defending three seats. The Australian Democrats were defending one seat. Senators Nick Bolkus (Labor), Dominic Foreman (Labor), Graham Maguire (Labor), Tony Messner (Liberal) and Amanda Vanstone (Liberal) were not up for re-election. The seat held by Senator Janine Haines (Democrats) was also not up for re-election, but was vacant due to her resignation to contest the House of Representatives; it was filled in April by Meg Lees.

Tasmania
Six seats were up for election. The Labor Party was defending two seats. The Liberal Party was defending three seats. The Australian Democrats were defending one seat. Senators Brian Archer (Liberal), Terry Aulich (Labor), John Coates (Labor), Brian Harradine (Independent), Michael Tate (Labor) and Shirley Walters (Liberal) were not up for re-election.

Victoria
Six seats were up for election. The Labor Party was defending two seats. The Liberal-National Coalition was defending four seats. Senators John Button (Labor), Gareth Evans (Labor), Austin Lewis (Liberal), Janet Powell (Democrats), Jim Short (Liberal) and Olive Zakharov (Labor) were not up for re-election.

Western Australia
Six seats were up for election. The Labor Party was defending two seats. The Liberal Party was defending two seats. The Australian Democrats were defending one seat. Senator Jo Vallentine, elected as an independent, was contesting the election for the Greens Western Australia. Senators Fred Chaney (Liberal), Peter Cook (Labor), Peter Durack (Liberal), Patricia Giles (Labor), Sue Knowles (Liberal) and Peter Walsh (Labor) were not up for re-election.

Summary by party 

Beside each party is the number of seats contested by that party in the House of Representatives for each state, as well as an indication of whether the party contested the Senate election in the respective state.

1Contested as a group of affiliated parties registered under the names Central Coast Green Party (2 candidates), Cowper Greens (1 candidate), Eastern Suburbs Greens (3 candidates), Greens in Lowe (1 candidate), Illawarra Greens (2 candidates), South Sydney Greens (3 candidates), Sydney Greens (1 candidate) and Western Suburbs Greens (5 candidates), with the Green Alliance Senate - New South Wales as the registered Senate name.

See also
 1990 Australian federal election
 Members of the Australian House of Representatives, 1987–1990
 Members of the Australian House of Representatives, 1990–1993
 Members of the Australian Senate, 1987–1990
 Members of the Australian Senate, 1990–1993
 List of political parties in Australia

References
Adam Carr's Election Archive - House of Representatives 1990
Adam Carr's Election Archive - Senate 1990

1990 in Australia
Candidates for Australian federal elections